SSSB may refer to:

 Ship Shore Ship Buffer
 Small Solar System body
 SSSB, the ICAO code for São Borja Airport
 Sy Syms School of Business, undergraduate school of Yeshiva University